Plahte is a Norwegian surname. Notable people with the surname include:

 Frithjof M. Plahte (1836–1899), Norwegian merchant
 Viktor Plahte (1878–1965), Norwegian businessman

See also
 Plate (surname)

Norwegian-language surnames